Penola Catholic College (also known as PCC or simply Penola) is a co-educational secondary college, located in Melbourne, Victoria, Australia. The Patron of the college is Saint Mary MacKillop. It has two campuses: one located at Glenroy which is commonly known as the junior campus for Years 7 and 8 students; and the other, the main campus, in Broadmeadows for the Years 9 to 12 students.

Penola Catholic College is the result of the amalgamation in 1995 of three Catholic secondary schools - Therry College, Geoghegan College and Sancta Sophia College. The site of Therry and Geoghegan Colleges now is the home to the Penola's Senior Campus (Years 9–12) which is located on Gibson Street, Broadmeadows. The Junior Campus of Penola (Year 7–8) is located on the original site of Sancta Sophia College in Glenroy.

The college is a member of the Sports Association of Catholic Co-educational Secondary Schools (SACCSS).

College emblem

The three leaves symbolise the spiritual, physical and intellectual growth potential of the members of the college community and also represent the three Colleges from which Penola Catholic College has sprung. The trunk of the tree is represented by the cross and points to the life of Christ as a model for the members of Penola Catholic College. The tree reminds us of the Aboriginal origins of the name Penola, which means stringybark.

The three words surrounding the emblem of Penola Catholic College are Faith, Excellence and Community which are the cornerstones of our school.

College name

The college name, Penola Catholic College, was chosen because of the strong link of our Broadmeadows campus with Saint Mary MacKillop and the Sisters of St Joseph who established a foundling home on this site in 1901. Penola, a small town in the south-east of South Australia, is where Mary MacKillop opened her first school in 1866 and where together with Julian Tenison Woods she founded the order of the Sisters of St Joseph of the Sacred Heart. The Sisters of St Joseph ministered to the local community and lived on this site from 1901 until the late 1980s.

Houses
The college operates a house group system. Students are divided into six house groups for the duration of their enrolment at the college. Students compete for house points in activities such as sport, debating and other extra curricular activities.

The six house groups are:
 Mackillop - Named after Mary MacKillop, the college's patron and is represented by the colour orange.
 Nolan - Named after Sister Livinus Nolan, long-serving Victorian Catholic school educator and member of the Sisters of St.Joseph. Nolan is represented by the colour purple.
 Geoghegan - Named after one of three colleges amalgamated to form the college, and is represented by the colour green.
 Smyth - Named after Thomas Smyth, founding Principal of Penola Catholic College and is represented by the colour blue.
 Therry - Named after one of three colleges amalgamated to form the college and is represented by the colour gold.
 Sancta Sophia - Named after one of three colleges amalgamated to form the college and is represented by the colour red.

Notable alumni

David Rodan
Adrian Zahra
Jeremy Synot
Eziyoda Magbegor

External links
 Penola Catholic College Website
 Penola Catholic College Facebook page

Catholic secondary schools in Melbourne
Educational institutions established in 1995
Broadmeadows, Victoria
1995 establishments in Australia
Buildings and structures in the City of Hume